Dwane Ronaldo James (born 4 December 1988 in Trinidad and Tobago) is a Trinidadian footballer.

Career

At the age of 19, James went to the United States with East Central Community College but left after a year due to no longer having enough money to pay. After that, he trialed with American top flight side Sporting Kansas City as well as fourth division team Atlanta Silverbacks. Even though they were both unsuccessful, James considers them to be highlight of his career.

In 2015, he trialed for Saprissa.

From Barrackpore United SC in the Trinidadian second division, he signed for Antigua GFC in Guatemala, making 5 league appearances there.

In 2016, James signed for Surinamese outfit S.V. Transvaal, before joining C.D. Pasaquina in El Salvador.

Since 2015, he has made 4 appearances for the Trinidad and Tobago national team.

Despite not sharing the same surname, he is the older brother of Trinidad and Tobago international Kevin Molino.

References

External links
 Dwane James at National Football Teams

Trinidad and Tobago footballers
Living people
Association football midfielders
1988 births
Association football defenders
Trinidad and Tobago international footballers
C.D. Pasaquina footballers